Viktor Nikolayevich Bykov (born 19 February 1945) is a retired Soviet cyclist from Ukraine. He competed at the 1968 and 1972 Summer Olympics in the 4 km team pursuit and finished in fourth and fifth place, respectively. He was part of the Soviet teams that won the team pursuit at the 1967 and 1969 UCI Track Cycling World Championships. Between 1965 and 1971 he won six national titles in the 4 km individual and team pursuit.

References

1945 births
Living people
Olympic cyclists of the Soviet Union
Cyclists at the 1968 Summer Olympics
Cyclists at the 1972 Summer Olympics
Soviet male cyclists